The Return is an Australian play by Reg Cribb. In 2001 it won the Patrick White Playwrights’ Award and was shortlisted for the Qld Premier’s Literary Award. In 2006 Reg Cribb adapted it to film, retitling it Last Train to Freo.

References
http://australianplays.org/playwright/ASC-375

2001 plays
Australian plays adapted into films